Sreemad Bhagavad Geetha is a 1977 Indian Malayalam-language film, directed and produced by P. Bhaskaran. The film stars  The film has musical score by V. Dakshinamoorthy.Sreemad Bhagavad Geetha

Cast

Srividya
Kaviyoor Ponnamma
KPAC Lalitha
Thikkurissy Sukumaran Nair
Jose Prakash
Manavalan Joseph
Mohan Sharma
O. Ramdas
Sankaradi
Sreemoolanagaram Vijayan
T. R. Omana
T. S. Muthaiah
Prathapachandran
G. K. Pillai
Mallika Sukumaran
Muralimohan
N. Govindankutty
P. K. Abraham
T. P. Madhavan
Vallathol Unnikrishnan
Vidhubala
Dashaavathaaram Ravikumar

Soundtrack
The music was composed by V. Dakshinamoorthy and the lyrics were written by P. Bhaskaran.

References

External links
 

1977 films
1970s Malayalam-language films
Films directed by P. Bhaskaran